Qaleh-ye Hadi Chakmeh Siah (also Romanized as Qal‘eh-ye Hādī Chakmeh Sīāh and Qal‘eh Ḩadī Chakmeh Seyāh; also known as Chakmeh Seyāh, Chakmeh Sīāh, and Qal‘eh-ye Hādī) is a village in Qaedrahmat Rural District, Zagheh District, Khorramabad County, Lorestan Province, Iran. At the 2006 census, its population was 120, in 25 families.

References 

Towns and villages in Khorramabad County